Cedar Creek is a creek in Kaufman County, Van Zandt County, and Henderson County in Texas.

It is a tributary to the Trinity River. The creek's impoundment forms the reservoir named Cedar Creek Lake.

Course
Cedar Creek begins in northern Kaufman County, flows down into the Cedar Creek Reservoir just east of King's Creek, flows underneath SH 31 between Trinidad and Malakoff. Its confluence with the Trinity River is south of Trinidad.

See also
List of rivers of Texas

Rivers of Texas
Trinity River (Texas)
Rivers of Henderson County, Texas
Rivers of Kaufman County, Texas
Rivers of Van Zandt County, Texas